Grant Mitchell (born July 19, 1951) is a Canadian politician and businessman. Over his career, he was leader of the Alberta Liberal Party and a member of the Senate of Canada.

Education
He received a BA degree from the University of Alberta and an MA degree from Queen's University.

Career
From 1976 to 1979, he worked as a public servant with the Government of Alberta. From 1979 to 1986, he worked in the financial sector as an executive with Edmonton's Principal Group.

From 1998 to 2005, while out of politics, Mitchell joined CIBC Wood Gundy as an investment advisor.

He has also served on the boards of the Canadian Commercial Corporation, the Edmonton ITU World Cup Triathlon and the Edmonton Police Foundation.

Political career

Provincial politics
Mitchell was first elected to the Alberta legislature as the Liberal MLA for Edmonton Meadowlark in 1986. Following his re-election in 1989, he was re-elected in 1993 and 1997 in the new riding of Edmonton McClung.

After placing second in the 1988 Liberal leadership contest to Edmonton mayor Laurence Decore, he became leader of the party and opposition leader in Alberta in 1994 and served until 1998, when he left provincial politics. He was succeeded as Liberal leader by Nancy MacBeth.

Federal politics
On March 24, 2005, he was appointed to the Canadian Senate by Governor General Adrienne Clarkson, on the advice of Prime Minister Paul Martin, where he represented Edmonton.

Mitchell served on three Senate committees:  National Finance; Legal and Constitutional Affairs; and Agriculture and Forestry.  He sat on the Senate committee for Human Rights and was deputy chair of the Senate Committee for Energy, the Environment and Natural Resources.

On January 29, 2014, Liberal Party leader Justin Trudeau announced all Liberal senators, including Mitchell, were removed from the Liberal caucus, and would continue sitting as independents. The senators referred to themselves as the Senate Liberal Caucus even though they were no longer members of the parliamentary Liberal caucus.

On May 2, 2016, he left the Senate Liberal Caucus to sit as an independent; the next day he was appointed whip by Government Representative in the Senate Peter Harder. As such Mitchell acted as a liaison between the government and senators and tried to secure votes for government legislation.

On November 29, 2019, the Prime Minister's Office announced that Senator Harder would step down from his position as Representative of the Government in the Senate effective December 31, 2019, and that Mitchell would step down as Government Liaison but continue in the role until Harder's successor was named in "due course." Marc Gold was named Harder's successor on January 24, 2020. Mitchell retired from the Senate on April 24, 2020.

Personal
Grant Mitchell is married to Teresa Mitchell (née Flood), an Edmonton lawyer. They have three sons: Lucas, Liam, Grady.

References

External links

Grant Mitchell

1951 births
Living people
Alberta Liberal Party MLAs
Businesspeople from Ottawa
Canadian senators from Alberta
Independent Canadian senators
Leaders of the Alberta Liberal Party
Liberal Party of Canada senators
Politicians from Ottawa
21st-century Canadian politicians